Pranciškus is a given name. Notable people with the name include:

 Pranciškus Būčys (1872–1951), titular bishop of the Eastern Catholic Church
 Pranciškus Baltrus Šivickis (1882–1968), Lithuanian zoologist
 Pranciškus Smuglevičius, Polish-Lithuanian draughtsman and painter
 Pranciškus Tupikas (1929–2015), Lithuanian politician

See also 
 Francis (given name)

Given names